Club Deportivo Pozoblanco is a Spanish football team based in Pozoblanco, Córdoba, in the autonomous community of Andalusia. Founded in 1926, it plays in Tercera División – Group 10, holding home matches at Estadio Municipal de Pozoblanco, with a 5,000-seat capacity.

Season to season

36 seasons in Tercera División
1 season in Tercera División RFEF

Former players
 Sergio Páez
 Pepe Díaz
 Antonio López
 Sergio Navarro

Former coaches
 Rafael Berges

References

External links
Official website 
Futbolme team profile 

Football clubs in Andalusia
Association football clubs established in 1926
1926 establishments in Spain
Province of Córdoba (Spain)